The Brittas Ponds, sometimes now Brittas Pond, also known as Brittas Reservoir, Brittas Lake(s),  Glenaraneen Lake or Glenaraneen Mill Ponds, are a pair of artificial lakes (or the upper of the two), situated north of the village of Brittas in the far south of the traditional County Dublin, near the County Wicklow border, in Ireland. They are in the jurisdiction of South Dublin County Council. From inception, the ponds were fed from the River Camac, returning water to it downstream. The southern pond is fully watered as of 2023, while the northern has partly dried into a marshy area.

History 
The pond structure was brought into existence due to the need for huge amounts of fresh water to service the Swiftbrook Paper Mills in Saggart village, approximately 4 kilometres downstream, and three other mills, including one at Clondalkin. 

The lands, then known as 'Bog Larkin', were sold by the Dowling family to John McDonnell (the owner of the mills) in 1847. They were naturally marshy, owing to their placement on a watershed between hills, and were subsequently flooded by the opening of a channel from the River Camac, to create a standing body of water. The object of at least the first (upper or southernmost) pond's creation was to create a space where a good reserve of water for the dry season could be kept, and to increase the water pressure to the level that certain mills downstream required. Prior to flooding, sloping embankments of about 30 feet in height were lined with large granite slabs from nearby Ballyknockan quarry to prevent erosion and flooding in the area and contain and maintain the boundary of the new lakes as levels rose. Turf banks were also used in the damming. The downstream lake was formed as a fish pond. An embankment separated the two ponds, with a canal, overflow and sluice. The southern pond was around 30 acres in size, the northern about 11 acres. 

The Saggart mills operated from c. 1760 until their closure in 1971, and possessed one of the largest water wheels in Ireland, which required 25,000 gallons of filtered water every hour for the 'washing' process alone.  The last mill complex to draw on the Brittas Ponds ceased operation in 1987. The Mansfield Group acquired the Brittas ponds when they bought the site of what was the former Clondalkin Paper Mills for the development of The Mill Shopping Centre.

Having been operational in 1993, by 2002, the northern pond was noted by the National Inventory of Architectural Heritage as being dry, however texts on the rivers of Dublin suggest that it remains damp or swampy, at least at times.

From 1888 until 1932, the Dublin and Blessington Steam Tramway passed by the ponds on their western side. The tram ran on the site of the modern N81 road, which hugs the modern lake and is the main Dublin to West Wicklow road.

Angling
The Brittas Ponds Fly-Fishing Club was founded in 1881, possibly re-formed in 1903 by Major Gamble, and was still in existence as of 2015.  In 1936, the club took a formal lease on the ponds, with exclusive fishing and bird hunting rights.  In 1986 the then landowners gave permission for new works by the club, which built a car park and a new boat-house, extended a small harbour and built a net storage hut. The ponds were stocked with trout and perch.

Crannog
There is a mound-shaped island in the pond area, which is generally considered to be a crannog, a site of early settlement commonly found in wet areas of Ireland. While it predates the modern lake formation, the ground was historically marshy, and would have been a potential site for such dwelling places.

Structure
The pond is fed by an offtake from the River Camac at the southern pond's south-eastern corner, which was historically operated by a sluice gate to regulate the water level; a short canal carried water from the southern to the northern pond. The Camac maintained its course just east of the pond and was rejoined by an outlet flow from the pond area (again controlled by a sluice) a short distance downstream of the northern pond. Although no longer operable, the remains of some of these sluice gates are still in existence.  As of 1993, the ponds had a depth of around 20 feet.

Small streams in valleys called Slad na bPlumpog and the Ferny Glinn used to supplement the northern pond, while the White Stone Slade helped feed the northern.

Future development
In 2021, a motion for the development of a leisure and tourism facility at a 100-acre site at the ponds was proposed by current owners, the Mansfield Group.

References

Sources

Reservoirs in the Republic of Ireland
River Liffey (system)